Japan participated in the 1998 Asian Games held in Bangkok, Thailand from December 6, 1998 to December 20, 1998.
This country was ranked 3rd with 52 gold medals, 61 silver medals and 68 bronze medals with a total of 181 medals
to secure its third spot in the medal tally.

References

Nations at the 1998 Asian Games
1998
Asian Games